Daylesford College is a government secondary school located in Daylesford, Hepburn Shire approximately an hour and a half drive from Melbourne. It is the only secondary college in Shire of Hepburn. Its principal is Steve MacPhail, and the assistant principals are Nick Cowan and Anna Treasure.

History
In 2015, the school's B-wing tragically burnt down.

Controversies
In 2015, the school was accused of photoshopping students' school photos, removing piercings, blemishes, acne, monobrows and freckles. The school denied these accusations, claiming that only piercings were edited out, in line with the school's piercing policy.

References

External links 
 www.daylesfordsc.vic.edu.au

Public high schools in Victoria (Australia)